Edward Winter (born 15 September 2004) is an Australian tennis player.

Winter has a career high ATP singles ranking of 1757 achieved on 13 December 2021. He also has a career high ATP doubles ranking of 770 achieved on 10 January 2022.

Winter made his ATP main draw debut at the 2022 Adelaide International 1 after receiving a wildcard into the doubles main draw with Aleksandar Vukic.

Career

2021: ITF Debut
Winter made his debut at the M15 Monastir in November 2021, reaching the quarterfinals in doubles and the second round in singles. Winter ended 2021 with a singles rank of No. 1767 and a doubles ranking of No. 2188.

2022: ATP debut 
In January 2022, Winter made his ATP main draw debut at the 2022 Adelaide International 1 after receiving a wildcard into the doubles main draw with Aleksandar Vukic. The duo reached the quarterfinals.

In January 2022, Winter defeated Gilles Simon a former world No.6 and two-time Grand Slam quarterfinalist in three sets in the first round of Australian Open qualifying. Winter lost in the second round.

ATP Challenger and ITF Futures finals

Singles: 1 (1–0)

Doubles 1 (1–1)

References

External links

2004 births
Living people
Australian male tennis players
Tennis players from Adelaide